Clontarf Beach State High School (CBSHS), opened 1964, is a co-educational, public high school based in Clontarf in Queensland, Australia. Clontarf State Primary School is located not far from it. The current principal is Jo House. The school's enrolment in 2008 was approximately 1148. In December 2008 the number was 1240. In 2008 Clontarf High was in the news for being in the most disrepair, however since then money has been spent making the school even safer for students and up grading the classrooms. Recently the school has built new tennis and futsal courts on the school oval and converted the old tennis courts into a one-of-a-kind Marine Science EcoCentre.

Academic
Clontarf Beach State High School currently enrolls students in Years 7–12. The junior school is years 7-9 and the senior school is years 10–12.

Uniform
Clontarf's formal uniform consists of a grey buttoned dress shirt with the school acronym on the shirt pocket with white socks and leather lace up shoes for the girls, grey shorts and grey shirt for the boys with long knee high socks and leather lace up shoes. In 2009 the school adopted a new sports uniform. It is mostly dark green and has yellow and blue stripes on the sides and a yellow and blue collar, while the dark green shorts and white socks have been retained from the old uniform. Years 7-10 Don't have to wear formals and only the sport uniform.

Sport
Clontarf has a proud history of sporting achievements that has unfortunately been reduced to mainly on-campus sport in recent years. The school competes against other schools in the district of Redcliffe such as Redcliffe State High School, Southern Cross Catholic College, Grace Lutheran College and Mueller College in years 8 and 9. Students can enroll in the year 8 and 9 soccer development program and also compete competitively against other schools in various sports like rugby league, soccer, netball, Rugby Union and basketball.

Notable alumni
Shane Nicholson - Singer/songwriter
Craig Moore - Football (soccer) player
Tina Thomsen - Actress
William McInnes - Actor & author
Brent Tate - Rugby league footballer
Terry Rogers - Politician
Kim Wilkins - Author
Don Meij - CEO of Domino's Australia

References

Public high schools in Queensland
Schools in South East Queensland
Educational institutions established in 1950
1950 establishments in Australia